The 1975 Orange Bowl was the 41st edition of the college football bowl game, played at the Orange Bowl in Miami, Florida, on Wednesday, January 1. Part of the 1974–75 bowl game season, it matched the ninth-ranked independent Notre Dame Fighting Irish and the undefeated #2 Alabama Crimson Tide of the Southeastern Conference (SEC). It was a rematch of the previous season's Sugar Bowl. In a game dominated by both defenses, underdog Notre Dame held on to upset the Tide,

Teams

Notre Dame

Notre Dame went 9–2 in the regular season, with losses to Purdue and USC. Following their victory over Navy, Orange Bowl officials announced an invitation to Notre Dame and Alabama. This was Notre Dame's sixth bowl game appearance and their second Orange Bowl. It was notable as Ara Parseghian's final game as head coach, as he announced his resignation from the position December 15. He was succeeded by Dan Devine, the head coach of the NFL's Green Bay Packers for four seasons, and previously led Missouri  and Arizona State

Alabama

Alabama won all eleven games in the regular season and were conference champions. Following their victory over Mississippi State, Orange Bowl officials announced Alabama accepted an invitation to play against Notre Dame in a rematch of the previous year's Sugar Bowl. It was Alabama's 28th bowl game appearance and seventh Orange Bowl.

Undefeated Alabama was first in the UPI coaches poll (#2 in AP poll) and favored by nine to ten points.

Game summary
Earlier in the evening in California, fifth-ranked USC won the Rose Bowl by a point over #3 Ohio State. Top-ranked Oklahoma was bowl ineligible, and #4 Michigan was also idle, as this was the final season that the Big Ten Conference (and Pac-8) allowed just one bowl team.

The final game of New Year's Day, the Orange Bowl kicked off at night; midway through the first quarter, Alabama's Willie Shelby fumbled a punt that was recovered by Notre Dame's Al Samuel at the Crimson Tide 16-yard line. Five plays later, the Irish scored on a four-yard Wayne Bullock touchdown run to take a 7–0 lead. Their lead was extended to 13–0 midway through the second quarter after Mark McLane scored on a nine-yard touchdown run to cap a 17-play drive that covered 77 yards. A 21-yard field goal by Danny Ridgeway cut the lead to 13–3 at the half.

After a scoreless third, the Crimson Tide scored a late touchdown on a 48-yard Richard Todd touchdown pass to Russ Schamun, and with a successful two-point conversion closed the gap to 13–11. After a defensive stop, Alabama got the ball back at its own 38 with under two minutes remaining, needing only a field goal to win. After two completions, the ball was on the Irish 38; Todd missed an open Ozzie Newsome and threw an interception to Reggie Barnett, effectively ending the comeback for the Tide. 
Bullock was the leading rusher at 83 yards, and was named the game's outstanding player, with Alabama defensive end Leroy Cook.

Aftermath
In an era of few postseason games, this was Alabama's sixteenth consecutive bowl appearance, but was the eighth straight without a victory (0–7–1). Their last postseason win was in  starting with the next season, the Tide won six consecutive bowl games.

Scoring

Statistics
{| class=wikitable style="text-align:center"
! Statistics !! Notre Dame !! Alabama
|-
| First Downs || 15|| 14
|-
| Rushes–yards|| 66–185|| 33–62
|-
| Passing yards|| 19|| 223
|-
| Passes (C–A–I) ||4–8–2 ||15–29–2 
|-
| Total Offense ||74–204||62–285
|-
|Punts–average ||6–38.0|| 7–40.0
|-
|Fumbles–lost ||1–1|| 5–2
|-
|Turnovers||3||4
|-
|Penalties–yards ||1–15|| 1–5
|}

References

1974–75 NCAA football bowl games
1975
1975
1975
1975 in sports in Florida
January 1975 sports events in the United States